Mount Cook is a mountain located on Magnetic Island within the Magnetic Island National Park, off the north east coast of Queensland, Australia. Mount Cook rises  out of the Coral Sea and is the highest point on the Magnetic Island.

See also

 List of mountains of Australia

References

Cook